Sky Pilot may refer to:

Slang
 Slang term (19th century, Western American) for a religious preacher; see 
 Slang term (20th century, British and American) for a military chaplain
 Pejorative (20th century, Wobbly lingo) for a member of the clergy who counsels passive acceptance of existing sociopolitical structures

Science
 Polemonium viscosum, an North American wildflower
 Polemonium eximium, a Western American wildflower
 Phacelia sericea, a Western American wildflower commonly called "Sky-pilot"

Art
 "Sky Pilot" (song), a 1968 song by Eric Burdon & The Animals
 The Sky Pilot, a 1921 film directed by King Vidor
 The Sky Pilot, an 1899 novel by Ralph Connor
 "Sky Pilot", a 1955 episode of American drama anthology series Navy Log
 Sky Pilot, a 1918 cover for Wheels magazine by Lawrence Atkinson

Other uses
 Sky Pilot Creek (Manitoba), a river in Canada
 Sky Pilot Lake, a lake of Carbon County, Montana
 Sky Pilot Mountain (British Columbia), Canada
 Sky Pilot Mountain (Montana), United States

See also
Skypilot, an Australian rock band